The Boatniks is a 1970 American comedy film directed by Norman Tokar and starring Robert Morse, Stefanie Powers, Don Ameche and Phil Silvers. It was made by Walt Disney Productions, released by Buena Vista Distribution.

Young and awkward, Coast Guard Ensign Thomas Garland (Morse) suffers from the comparison with his late father, a war hero, which does not prevent him from falling for pretty Kate Fairchild (Powers), a young woman who manages a sailing school. Of course, the way he expresses his deep feelings for the lady leaves much to be desired, and the situation does not improve when a trio of bumbling jewel thieves interferes.

Wally Cox had a supporting role playing a man who manages a boat for girls to give parties for the purposes of socializing with men.

Plot
Lieutenant Jordan, U.S. Coast Guard, responds to a number of pleas for help from civilian pleasure boat sailors around Southern California's Balboa Island. This type of event is typical of what the Coast Guard deals with on a regular basis, and is one of the reasons why Jordan has requested to transfer to a new station. He is handing over the reins to Ensign Tom Garland, a polite but remarkably clumsy fellow who will now report to Commander Taylor, a man who fought in World War II with Garland's father and holds him in high regard.

Through a series of events, Garland's ineptitude as the station's new skipper is revealed. He repeatedly flounders in tending to the various minor issues plaguing the crowded waters' impatient travelers. It also does not take long for him to fall for Kate Fairchild, a "girl next door" who runs a local boat rental and sailing school spot on the coast.

Meanwhile, three jewel thieves are making their way to Mexico while listening to reports of their pursuit. There's ringleader Harry Simmons, who poses as a yacht club "commodore" and dispatches orders to his two associates, Charlie, and Max. This trio has managed to steal a jewel collection, and they intend to smuggle them inside an assortment of casually hollowed food. They decide to rent a boat from Kate to make their way south of the border, although none of the three know how to sail.

With Kate's suggestion that the crooks' suspicious behavior might indicate criminality, she and Tom begin to suspect that they are indeed the three men reported about in a newspaper article. Tom is right about the suspects, but Commander Taylor initially does not believe it. Ultimately, Tom is able to convince Taylor to retrieve the stolen jewels, and ensure that the jewel thieves are arrested. THe film ends when the boat is about to get into a collision with the abandoned sub like craft, which would have capsized the boat.

Cast
 Robert Morse as Ensign Garland
 Stefanie Powers as Kate
 Phil Silvers as Harry Simmons
 Norman Fell as Max
 Mickey Shaughnessy as Charlie
 Wally Cox as Jason
 Don Ameche as Commander Taylor
 Joey Forman as Lt. Jordan
 Vito Scotti as Pepe Galindo
 Tom Lowell as Wagner
 Robert Hastings as Chief Walsh
 Sammy Jackson as Garlotti
 Joe E. Ross as Nutty Sailor
 Judith Jordan as Tina
 Al Lewis as Bert
 Midori as Chiyoko Kuni
 Kelly Thordsen as Motorcycle Cop
 Gil Lamb as Mr. Mitchell

Release
The Boatniks was released on July 1, 1970 at the Ziegfeld Theatre in New York City. It was re-released theatrically on June 10, 1977.

Home media
It was released twice on VHS in November 1983 and March 18, 1997, DVD on August 2, 2005, and Blu-ray on June 21, 2016 in a Disney Movie Club exclusive, 45th Anniversary Edition.

Reception
In 1970, the film earned an estimated $5 million in North American rentals. By 1976 this figure was up to $6.6 million.

Roger Greenspun of The New York Times wrote that the film "isn't a good movie about boating, and it doesn't really try to be. It isn't good situation comedy either, though it does try to be." Variety stated, "There's nothing that isn't familiar about the comedy in this Disney summer release, but it's so well handled that even anticipated gags come through with honors." Kevin Thomas of the Los Angeles Times called it "a better than usual Disney comedy. It wisely involves a lot of very good people in a series of mishaps of which they make the absolute most." Writing in The Washington Post, Judith Martin thought the film was "better than most," but she expressed concern about the "humor based on national and sexual stereotypes," including "[t]wo separate instances of the old Mexican-American caricature done in a way that no one would dare do about blacks these days." The Monthly Film Bulletin wrote, "Characteristically wholesome Disney comedy, quite enjoyable on its own unsophisticated level though not in the same class as The Love Bug, mainly because of a surfeit of dialogue (and a consequent lack of sight gags) and Robert Morse's slight unease in conveying the central character's easygoing amiability."

See also

 List of American films of 1970

References

External links
 
 
 
 
 

1970 films
1970 comedy films
1970s heist films
American comedy films
American heist films
1970s English-language films
Films about the United States Coast Guard
Films directed by Norman Tokar
Films produced by Ron W. Miller
Films set in Orange County, California
Walt Disney Pictures films
1970s American films